The Year's Best Science Fiction: Sixteenth Annual Collection is a science fiction anthology edited by Gardner Dozois that was published in 1999.  It is the 16th in The Year's Best Science Fiction series.

Contents

The book includes a 49-page summation by Dozois; 25 stories, all that first appeared in 1998, and each with a two-paragraph introduction by Dozois; and a seven-page referenced list of honorable mentions for the year. The stories are as follows.

Greg Egan: "Oceanic"
Geoffrey A. Landis: "Approaching Perimelasma"
Cory Doctorow: "Craphound"
Tanith Lee: "Jedella Ghost"
Bruce Sterling: "Taklamakan"
Ursula K. Le Guin: "The Island Of the Immortals"
Paul J. McAuley: "Sea Change, With Monsters"
Robert Charles Wilson: "Divided By Infinity"
Howard Waldrop: "US"
Ian McDonald: "The Days Of Solomon Gursky"
Robert Reed: "The Cuckoo's Boys"
William Browning Spencer: "The Halfway House At the Heart Of Darkness"
Michael Swanwick: "The Very Pulse of the Machine"
Ted Chiang: "Story Of Your Life"
Liz Williams: "Voivodoi"
Stephen Baxter: "Saddlepoint: Roughneck"
Rob Chilson: "This Side Of Independence"
Chris Lawson: "Unborn Again"
Tony Daniel: "Grist"
Gwyneth Jones: "La Cenerentola"
William Barton: "Down In the Dark"
Jim Grimsley: "Free In Asveroth"
Cherry Wilder: "The Dancing Floor"
Ian R. MacLeod: "The Summer Isles"

1999 anthologies
16
St. Martin's Press books